Hisab Nikas  is an Odia film  was released in 1982. It was produced, directed and written by  Prashant Nanda and music was arranged by Prafulla Kar. The movie featured Prashant Nanda, Sriram Panda, Mahasweta Ray, Jharana Das, Biren Routray & Deepa Sahu. It was the first Cinemascope movie in Odia cinema history.

References

External links 

1982 films
1980s Odia-language films
Films directed by Prashanta Nanda